Stop That Man! is a 1928 American silent comedy film directed by Nat Ross and starring Arthur Lake, Barbara Kent and Eddie Gribbon. The screenplay concerns a man who accidentally assists a group of criminals.

Plot summary
The young brother of two police officers borrows one of their uniforms. While masquerading as a cop, he accidentally assists a group of criminals committing a burglary. Fortunately he is able to capture the culprits and deliver them to the real police.

Cast
 Arthur Lake as Tommy O'Brien 
 Barbara Kent as Muriel Crawford  
 Eddie Gribbon as Bill O'Brien  
 Warner Richmond as Jim O'Brien  
 Walter McGrail as 'Slippery Dick' Sylvaine  
 George Siegmann as 'Butch' Barker  
 Joseph W. Girard as Captain Ryan

References

Bibliography
 Langman, Larry. American Film Cycles: The Silent Era. Greenwood Publishing Group, 1998.

External links

1928 films
1928 comedy films
Silent American comedy films
Films directed by Nat Ross
American silent feature films
1920s English-language films
Universal Pictures films
American black-and-white films
Films with screenplays by Joseph F. Poland
1920s American films